Mountain running is a sports discipline which takes place mainly off-road in mountainous terrain, but if there is significant elevation gain on the route, surfaced roads may be used. In this it differs from fell running; also its courses are more clearly marked and avoid dangerous sections. It is a form of trail running if it is run on unpaved surfaces. Mountain running is a combination of running, jogging, and walking, depending on how steep the trail is.

It is recognized by World Athletics and governed by the World Mountain Running Association that since 1985 organizes world championships.

International federation
The World Mountain Running Association (WMRA) is the global governing body of mountain running. For World Athletics purposes, mountain running takes place on terrain that is mainly off-road, but if there is significant elevation gain on the route, surfaced roads may be used. Courses involve considerable amounts of ascent (for mainly uphill races), or both ascent and descent (for up and down races with the start and finish at similar heights). The average incline is normally between five and twenty percent. Courses are clearly marked and should avoid dangerous sections.

World championships

The WMRA organizes two different types of world championships, for regular distances the World Mountain Running Championships (until 2008 called World Mountain Running Trophy) and long distances the World Long Distance Mountain Running Championships (until 2014 called World Long Distance Mountain Running Challenge).

Long-distance mountain running

Races more than 20 km, but no longer than 45 km, including an uphill ascent of at least 1.6 km.

See also
Cross country running
Fastpacking
Mountain biking
Skyrunning

References

External links
 World Mountain Running Association official website